Highland is an unincorporated community in Clayton County, Iowa, United States. The county seat of Elkader lies approximately 10 miles to the southeast.

History
Founded in the 1800s, Highland's population was 12 in 1902.

References

Unincorporated communities in Clayton County, Iowa
Unincorporated communities in Iowa